25D/Neujmin, otherwise known as Comet Neujmin 2, is a periodic comet in the Solar System discovered by Grigory N. Neujmin (Simeis) on February 24, 1916. It was last observed on February 10, 1927.

It was confirmed by George Van Biesbroeck (Yerkes Observatory, Wisconsin, United States) and Frank Watson Dyson (Greenwich Observatory, England) on March 1.

A prediction by Andrew Crommelin (Royal Observatory, Greenwich, England) for 1921 was considered unfavourable and no observations were made. The comet was recovered in 1926. Searches in 1932 and 1937 were unsuccessful.

Consequently, this comet has remained a lost comet since 1927.  and using the JPL Horizons nominal orbit, the comet is still expected to come to perihelion around 1.3 AU from the Sun.

References

External links 
 Orbital simulation from JPL (Java) / Horizons Ephemeris
 25D at Kronk's Cometography
 25D at Kazuo Kinoshita's Comets
 25D at Seiichi Yoshida's Comet Catalog

Periodic comets
Lost comets
0025
19160224